Afro-French Guianans or Black French Guianans are French Guianan people who are of African descent.

As of 2003, people of African descent (including those of mixed African and European ancestry) are the majority ethnic group in French Guiana accounting for around 66% of the territory's population.

Notable Afro French Guianan 
 Allan Saint-Maximin
Simon Falette
Florent Malouda
 Lesly Malouda
Mike Maignan
 Jason Pendant
 Ludovic Baal
 Rodolphe Alexandre
 Kévin Rimane
 Raoul Diagne
 Roy Contout
 Rhudy Evens
 Sloan Privat
Marc-Antoine Fortuné

References and footnotes 

African
Ethnic groups in French Guiana